The 1952 VFL season was the 56th season of the Victorian Football League (VFL), the highest level senior Australian rules football competition in Victoria. The season featured twelve clubs, ran from 19 April until 27 September, and comprised a 19-game home-and-away season followed by a finals series featuring the top four clubs.

The premiership was won by the Geelong Football Club for the fifth time and second time consecutively. Geelong defeated  by 46 points in the 1952 VFL Grand Final, as part of a 23-game winning streak spanning the 1952 and 1953 seasons which stands as the longest in league history.

Premiership season
In 1952, the VFL competition consisted of twelve teams of 18 on-the-field players each, plus two substitute players, known as the 19th man and the 20th man. A player could be substituted for any reason; however, once substituted, a player could not return to the field of play under any circumstances.

Teams played each other in a home-and-away season of 19 rounds.

There was an extra round (round 8), in addition to 1951's 18 rounds. Promoted as a "National Day Round", it was held on the Saturday (14 June) of the Queen's Birthday weekend and saw all clubs play a match for premiership points at country or interstate locations, while the Victorian State side played against the West Australian State side at Melbourne Cricket Ground.

The season was constructed as follows: in rounds 1 to 7 and 9 to 12 the teams played each other. Round 8, the "National Day Round", was the reverse of round 11 (and the designated round 8 "home team" was the reverse of that in round 11). Rounds 13 to 19 were the "home-and-away reverse" of rounds 1 to 7.

Once the 19 round home-and-away season had finished, the 1952 VFL Premiers were determined by the specific format and conventions of the Page–McIntyre system.

Round 1

|- bgcolor="#CCCCFF"
| Home team
| Home team score
| Away team
| Away team score
| Venue
| Crowd
| Date
|- bgcolor="#FFFFFF"
| 
| 5.15 (45)
| 
| 7.12 (54)
| Brunswick Street Oval
| 20,500
| 19 April 1952
|- bgcolor="#FFFFFF"
| 
| 11.16 (82)
| 
| 8.26 (74)
| Lake Oval
| 18,000
| 19 April 1952
|- bgcolor="#FFFFFF"
| 
| 14.13 (97)
| 
| 15.13 (103)
| MCG
| 25,000
| 19 April 1952
|- bgcolor="#FFFFFF"
| 
| 6.10 (46)
| 
| 6.5 (41)
| Western Oval
| 24,000
| 19 April 1952
|- bgcolor="#FFFFFF"
| 
| 2.8 (20)
| 
| 15.16 (106)
| Glenferrie Oval
| 14,000
| 19 April 1952
|- bgcolor="#FFFFFF"
| 
| 8.19 (67)
| 
| 13.12 (90)
| Arden Street Oval
| 22,000
| 19 April 1952

Round 2

|- bgcolor="#CCCCFF"
| Home team
| Home team score
| Away team
| Away team score
| Venue
| Crowd
| Date
|- bgcolor="#FFFFFF"
| 
| 14.12 (96)
| 
| 13.11 (89)
| Windy Hill
| 21,000
| 26 April 1952
|- bgcolor="#FFFFFF"
| 
| 13.17 (95)
| 
| 8.14 (62)
| Victoria Park
| 26,000
| 26 April 1952
|- bgcolor="#FFFFFF"
| 
| 12.12 (84)
| 
| 13.11 (89)
| Princes Park
| 31,500
| 26 April 1952
|- bgcolor="#FFFFFF"
| 
| 13.11 (89)
| 
| 12.19 (91)
| Junction Oval
| 19,000
| 26 April 1952
|- bgcolor="#FFFFFF"
| 
| 12.10 (82)
| 
| 8.14 (62)
| Punt Road Oval
| 13,000
| 26 April 1952
|- bgcolor="#FFFFFF"
| 
| 10.4 (64)
| 
| 7.15 (57)
| Kardinia Park
| 30,000
| 26 April 1952

Round 3

|- bgcolor="#CCCCFF"
| Home team
| Home team score
| Away team
| Away team score
| Venue
| Crowd
| Date
|- bgcolor="#FFFFFF"
| 
| 14.15 (99)
| 
| 5.4 (34)
| Kardinia Park
| 20,500
| 3 May 1952
|- bgcolor="#FFFFFF"
| 
| 9.21 (75)
| 
| 7.9 (51)
| Victoria Park
| 34,000
| 3 May 1952
|- bgcolor="#FFFFFF"
| 
| 10.12 (72)
| 
| 13.14 (92)
| Princes Park
| 25,500
| 3 May 1952
|- bgcolor="#FFFFFF"
| 
| 14.17 (101)
| 
| 12.9 (81)
| Lake Oval
| 28,500
| 3 May 1952
|- bgcolor="#FFFFFF"
| 
| 8.12 (60)
| 
| 10.14 (74)
| MCG
| 13,500
| 3 May 1952
|- bgcolor="#FFFFFF"
| 
| 11.11 (77)
| 
| 10.6 (66)
| Arden Street Oval
| 20,000
| 3 May 1952

Round 4

|- bgcolor="#CCCCFF"
| Home team
| Home team score
| Away team
| Away team score
| Venue
| Crowd
| Date
|- bgcolor="#FFFFFF"
| 
| 11.3 (69)
| 
| 8.12 (60)
| Glenferrie Oval
| 15,000
| 10 May 1952
|- bgcolor="#FFFFFF"
| 
| 6.16 (52)
| 
| 10.16 (76)
| Western Oval
| 20,000
| 10 May 1952
|- bgcolor="#FFFFFF"
| 
| 6.15 (51)
| 
| 14.16 (100)
| Brunswick Street Oval
| 19,500
| 10 May 1952
|- bgcolor="#FFFFFF"
| 
| 18.13 (121)
| 
| 16.15 (111)
| Punt Road Oval
| 24,000
| 10 May 1952
|- bgcolor="#FFFFFF"
| 
| 8.16 (64)
| 
| 12.12 (84)
| Junction Oval
| 19,500
| 10 May 1952
|- bgcolor="#FFFFFF"
| 
| 13.9 (87)
| 
| 13.16 (94)
| Windy Hill
| 28,000
| 10 May 1952

Round 5

|- bgcolor="#CCCCFF"
| Home team
| Home team score
| Away team
| Away team score
| Venue
| Crowd
| Date
|- bgcolor="#FFFFFF"
| 
| 8.9 (57)
| 
| 10.11 (71)
| MCG
| 27,000
| 17 May 1952
|- bgcolor="#FFFFFF"
| 
| 11.16 (82)
| 
| 6.10 (46)
| Kardinia Park
| 20,000
| 17 May 1952
|- bgcolor="#FFFFFF"
| 
| 9.6 (60)
| 
| 5.6 (36)
| Western Oval
| 22,500
| 17 May 1952
|- bgcolor="#FFFFFF"
| 
| 6.6 (42)
| 
| 5.11 (41)
| Brunswick Street Oval
| 9,500
| 17 May 1952
|- bgcolor="#FFFFFF"
| 
| 11.10 (76)
| 
| 18.8 (116)
| Junction Oval
| 17,500
| 17 May 1952
|- bgcolor="#FFFFFF"
| 
| 15.16 (106)
| 
| 7.14 (56)
| Victoria Park
| 36,000
| 17 May 1952

Round 6

|- bgcolor="#CCCCFF"
| Home team
| Home team score
| Away team
| Away team score
| Venue
| Crowd
| Date
|- bgcolor="#FFFFFF"
| 
| 12.19 (91)
| 
| 4.5 (29)
| Victoria Park
| 20,500
| 31 May 1952
|- bgcolor="#FFFFFF"
| 
| 14.10 (94)
| 
| 10.13 (73)
| Princes Park
| 12,500
| 31 May 1952
|- bgcolor="#FFFFFF"
| 
| 6.13 (49)
| 
| 9.9 (63)
| Arden Street Oval
| 11,000
| 31 May 1952
|- bgcolor="#FFFFFF"
| 
| 8.7 (55)
| 
| 11.13 (79)
| Punt Road Oval
| 25,000
| 31 May 1952
|- bgcolor="#FFFFFF"
| 
| 14.12 (96)
| 
| 9.11 (65)
| Lake Oval
| 15,000
| 31 May 1952
|- bgcolor="#FFFFFF"
| 
| 5.14 (44)
| 
| 15.8 (98)
| Glenferrie Oval
| 14,000
| 31 May 1952

Round 7

|- bgcolor="#CCCCFF"
| Home team
| Home team score
| Away team
| Away team score
| Venue
| Crowd
| Date
|- bgcolor="#FFFFFF"
| 
| 8.15 (63)
| 
| 3.6 (24)
| Brunswick Street Oval
| 10,300
| 7 June 1952
|- bgcolor="#FFFFFF"
| 
| 12.8 (80)
| 
| 7.8 (50)
| Arden Street Oval
| 11,000
| 7 June 1952
|- bgcolor="#FFFFFF"
| 
| 12.10 (82)
| 
| 6.14 (50)
| MCG
| 58,543
| 7 June 1952
|- bgcolor="#FFFFFF"
| 
| 7.18 (60)
| 
| 10.9 (69)
| Windy Hill
| 29,000
| 9 June 1952
|- bgcolor="#FFFFFF"
| 
| 18.12 (120)
| 
| 13.15 (93)
| Princes Park
| 37,500
| 9 June 1952
|- bgcolor="#FFFFFF"
| 
| 16.14 (110)
| 
| 11.13 (79)
| Lake Oval
| 26,000
| 9 June 1952

Round 8 (National Day Round)

|- bgcolor="#CCCCFF"
| Home team
| Home team score
| Away team
| Away team score
| Venue
| Crowd
| Date
|- bgcolor="#FFFFFF"
| 
| 5.6 (36)
| 
| 10.12 (72)
| SCG
| 24,174
| 14 June 1952
|- bgcolor="#FFFFFF"
| 
| 13.12 (90)
| 
| 10.10 (70)
| North Hobart Oval
| 18,387
| 14 June 1952
|- bgcolor="#FFFFFF"
| 
| 18.10 (118) 
| 
| 14.12 (96)
| Albury Sports Ground
| 15,000
| 14 June 1952
|- bgcolor="#FFFFFF"
| 
| 5.4 (34)
| 
| 7.7 (49)
| Yallourn Oval
| 3,500
| 14 June 1952
|- bgcolor="#FFFFFF"
| 
| 17.15 (117)
| 
| 11.14 (80)
| Euroa Oval
| 7,500
| 14 June 1952
|- bgcolor="#FFFFFF"
| 
| 12.14 (86)
| 
| 23.17 (155)
| Brisbane Exhibition Ground
| 28,000
| 16 June 1952

Round 9

|- bgcolor="#CCCCFF"
| Home team
| Home team score
| Away team
| Away team score
| Venue
| Crowd
| Date
|- bgcolor="#FFFFFF"
| 
| 7.13 (55)
| 
| 4.11 (35)
| Kardinia Park
| 21,513
| 21 June 1952
|- bgcolor="#FFFFFF"
| 
| 11.8 (74)
| 
| 10.15 (75)
| Windy Hill
| 16,000
| 21 June 1952
|- bgcolor="#FFFFFF"
| 
| 6.8 (44)
| 
| 8.12 (60)
| Victoria Park
| 15,500
| 21 June 1952
|- bgcolor="#FFFFFF"
| 
| 5.11 (41)
| 
| 7.6 (48)
| Junction Oval
| 7,500
| 21 June 1952
|- bgcolor="#FFFFFF"
| 
| 6.9 (45)
| 
| 7.8 (50)
| Western Oval
| 14,085
| 21 June 1952
|- bgcolor="#FFFFFF"
| 
| 5.3 (33)
| 
| 5.9 (39)
| Punt Road Oval
| 21,000
| 21 June 1952

Round 10

|- bgcolor="#CCCCFF"
| Home team
| Home team score
| Away team
| Away team score
| Venue
| Crowd
| Date
|- bgcolor="#FFFFFF"
| 
| 9.10 (64)
| 
| 5.9 (39)
| Arden Street Oval
| 7,000
| 28 June 1952
|- bgcolor="#FFFFFF"
| 
| 12.11 (83)
| 
| 6.10 (46)
| MCG
| 23,557
| 28 June 1952
|- bgcolor="#FFFFFF"
| 
| 15.22 (112)
| 
| 8.9 (57)
| Princes Park
| 12,617
| 28 June 1952
|- bgcolor="#FFFFFF"
| 
| 6.8 (44)
| 
| 10.10 (70)
| Glenferrie Oval
| 7,500
| 28 June 1952
|- bgcolor="#FFFFFF"
| 
| 13.12 (90)
| 
| 5.8 (38)
| Brunswick Street Oval
| 12,500
| 28 June 1952
|- bgcolor="#FFFFFF"
| 
| 9.10 (64)
| 
| 12.13 (85)
| Lake Oval
| 21,000
| 28 June 1952

Round 11

|- bgcolor="#CCCCFF"
| Home team
| Home team score
| Away team
| Away team score
| Venue
| Crowd
| Date
|- bgcolor="#FFFFFF"
| 
| 7.4 (46)
| 
| 10.17 (77)
| Arden Street Oval
| 15,000
| 5 July 1952
|- bgcolor="#FFFFFF"
| 
| 10.16 (76)
| 
| 11.10 (76)
| Windy Hill
| 21,000
| 5 July 1952
|- bgcolor="#FFFFFF"
| 
| 10.19 (79)
| 
| 8.8 (56)
| Victoria Park
| 21,911
| 5 July 1952
|- bgcolor="#FFFFFF"
| 
| 11.13 (79)
| 
| 12.13 (85)
| Junction Oval
| 7,800
| 5 July 1952
|- bgcolor="#FFFFFF"
| 
| 11.7 (73)
| 
| 11.17 (83)
| MCG
| 25,089
| 5 July 1952
|- bgcolor="#FFFFFF"
| 
| 5.11 (41)
| 
| 9.24 (78)
| Glenferrie Oval
| 11,000
| 5 July 1952

Round 12

|- bgcolor="#CCCCFF"
| Home team
| Home team score
| Away team
| Away team score
| Venue
| Crowd
| Date
|- bgcolor="#FFFFFF"
| 
| 10.17 (77)
| 
| 6.8 (44)
| Punt Road Oval
| 9,000
| 12 July 1952
|- bgcolor="#FFFFFF"
| 
| 4.11 (35)
| 
| 9.4 (58)
| Western Oval
| 12,218
| 12 July 1952
|- bgcolor="#FFFFFF"
| 
| 13.11 (89)
| 
| 10.11 (71)
| Brunswick Street Oval
| 10,500
| 12 July 1952
|- bgcolor="#FFFFFF"
| 
| 6.14 (50)
| 
| 6.14 (50)
| Princes Park
| 24,839
| 12 July 1952
|- bgcolor="#FFFFFF"
| 
| 8.12 (60)
| 
| 9.15 (69)
| Lake Oval
| 27,000
| 12 July 1952
|- bgcolor="#FFFFFF"
| 
| 9.8 (62)
| 
| 4.9 (33)
| Kardinia Park
| 36,145
| 12 July 1952

Round 13

|- bgcolor="#CCCCFF"
| Home team
| Home team score
| Away team
| Away team score
| Venue
| Crowd
| Date
|- bgcolor="#FFFFFF"
| 
| 5.8 (38)
| 
| 6.8 (44)
| Junction Oval
| 15,000
| 19 July 1952
|- bgcolor="#FFFFFF"
| 
| 14.26 (110)
| 
| 8.6 (54)
| Kardinia Park
| 21,744
| 19 July 1952
|- bgcolor="#FFFFFF"
| 
| 5.12 (42)
| 
| 7.15 (57)
| Windy Hill
| 17,000
| 19 July 1952
|- bgcolor="#FFFFFF"
| 
| 12.15 (87)
| 
| 4.4 (28)
| Victoria Park
| 12,643
| 19 July 1952
|- bgcolor="#FFFFFF"
| 
| 5.23 (53)
| 
| 5.8 (38)
| Princes Park
| 21,055
| 19 July 1952
|- bgcolor="#FFFFFF"
| 
| 5.17 (47)
| 
| 11.10 (76)
| Punt Road Oval
| 18,000
| 19 July 1952

Round 14

|- bgcolor="#CCCCFF"
| Home team
| Home team score
| Away team
| Away team score
| Venue
| Crowd
| Date
|- bgcolor="#FFFFFF"
| 
| 11.12 (78)
| 
| 8.10 (58)
| MCG
| 14,045
| 26 July 1952
|- bgcolor="#FFFFFF"
| 
| 8.14 (62)
| 
| 14.7 (91)
| Glenferrie Oval
| 11,000
| 26 July 1952
|- bgcolor="#FFFFFF"
| 
| 8.9 (57)
| 
| 9.12 (66)
| Western Oval
| 22,759
| 26 July 1952
|- bgcolor="#FFFFFF"
| 
| 7.11 (53)
| 
| 7.8 (50)
| Arden Street Oval
| 15,000
| 26 July 1952
|- bgcolor="#FFFFFF"
| 
| 5.6 (36)
| 
| 4.11 (35)
| Brunswick Street Oval
| 26,000
| 26 July 1952
|- bgcolor="#FFFFFF"
| 
| 10.16 (76)
| 
| 10.16 (76)
| Lake Oval
| 32,000
| 26 July 1952

Round 15

|- bgcolor="#CCCCFF"
| Home team
| Home team score
| Away team
| Away team score
| Venue
| Crowd
| Date
|- bgcolor="#FFFFFF"
| 
| 10.14 (74)
| 
| 12.14 (86)
| Punt Road Oval
| 19,000
| 2 August 1952
|- bgcolor="#FFFFFF"
| 
| 9.3 (57)
| 
| 12.13 (85)
| Glenferrie Oval
| 9,000
| 2 August 1952
|- bgcolor="#FFFFFF"
| 
| 7.6 (48)
| 
| 8.9 (57)
| Western Oval
| 14,760
| 2 August 1952
|- bgcolor="#FFFFFF"
| 
| 7.13 (55)
| 
| 9.16 (70)
| Junction Oval
| 12,000
| 2 August 1952
|- bgcolor="#FFFFFF"
| 
| 13.10 (88)
| 
| 12.17 (89)
| Windy Hill
| 21,000
| 2 August 1952
|- bgcolor="#FFFFFF"
| 
| 5.15 (45)
| 
| 5.14 (44)
| Brunswick Street Oval
| 29,000
| 2 August 1952

Round 16

|- bgcolor="#CCCCFF"
| Home team
| Home team score
| Away team
| Away team score
| Venue
| Crowd
| Date
|- bgcolor="#FFFFFF"
| 
| 14.10 (94)
| 
| 9.12 (66)
| Arden Street Oval
| 12,000
| 9 August 1952
|- bgcolor="#FFFFFF"
| 
| 20.19 (139)
| 
| 8.7 (55)
| Victoria Park
| 14,100
| 9 August 1952
|- bgcolor="#FFFFFF"
| 
| 11.16 (82)
| 
| 12.11 (83)
| Princes Park
| 34,000
| 9 August 1952
|- bgcolor="#FFFFFF"
| 
| 6.14 (50)
| 
| 9.14 (68)
| Lake Oval
| 12,000
| 9 August 1952
|- bgcolor="#FFFFFF"
| 
| 15.17 (107)
| 
| 8.12 (60)
| MCG
| 17,421
| 9 August 1952
|- bgcolor="#FFFFFF"
| 
| 12.16 (88)
| 
| 5.10 (40)
| Kardinia Park
| 31,314
| 9 August 1952

Round 17

|- bgcolor="#CCCCFF"
| Home team
| Home team score
| Away team
| Away team score
| Venue
| Crowd
| Date
|- bgcolor="#FFFFFF"
| 
| 22.15 (147)
| 
| 7.9 (51)
| Windy Hill
| 12,000
| 16 August 1952
|- bgcolor="#FFFFFF"
| 
| 12.16 (88)
| 
| 9.13 (67)
| Princes Park
| 42,662
| 16 August 1952
|- bgcolor="#FFFFFF"
| 
| 10.14 (74)
| 
| 8.18 (66)
| Lake Oval
| 24,000
| 16 August 1952
|- bgcolor="#FFFFFF"
| 
| 11.9 (75)
| 
| 15.13 (103)
| Arden Street Oval
| 15,000
| 16 August 1952
|- bgcolor="#FFFFFF"
| 
| 13.11 (89)
| 
| 5.14 (44)
| Punt Road Oval
| 11,000
| 16 August 1952
|- bgcolor="#FFFFFF"
| 
| 7.6 (48)
| 
| 12.12 (84)
| Glenferrie Oval
| 12,000
| 16 August 1952

Round 18

|- bgcolor="#CCCCFF"
| Home team
| Home team score
| Away team
| Away team score
| Venue
| Crowd
| Date
|- bgcolor="#FFFFFF"
| 
| 11.16 (82)
| 
| 15.7 (97)
| MCG
| 16,402
| 23 August 1952
|- bgcolor="#FFFFFF"
| 
| 17.9 (111)
| 
| 10.7 (67)
| Kardinia Park
| 21,318
| 23 August 1952
|- bgcolor="#FFFFFF"
| 
| 9.10 (64)
| 
| 7.15 (57)
| Brunswick Street Oval
| 29,000
| 23 August 1952
|- bgcolor="#FFFFFF"
| 
| 20.12 (132)
| 
| 11.11 (77)
| Windy Hill
| 12,000
| 23 August 1952
|- bgcolor="#FFFFFF"
| 
| 6.14 (50)
| 
| 14.15 (99)
| Western Oval
| 20,584
| 23 August 1952
|- bgcolor="#FFFFFF"
| 
| 8.8 (56)
| 
| 13.14 (92)
| Junction Oval
| 18,000
| 23 August 1952

Round 19

|- bgcolor="#CCCCFF"
| Home team
| Home team score
| Away team
| Away team score
| Venue
| Crowd
| Date
|- bgcolor="#FFFFFF"
| 
| 8.11 (59)
| 
| 12.10 (82)
| Glenferrie Oval
| 6,000
| 30 August 1952
|- bgcolor="#FFFFFF"
| 
| 13.13 (91)
| 
| 8.13 (61)
| Western Oval
| 20,723
| 30 August 1952
|- bgcolor="#FFFFFF"
| 
| 13.14 (92)
| 
| 10.11 (71)
| Victoria Park
| 18,753
| 30 August 1952
|- bgcolor="#FFFFFF"
| 
| 10.12 (72)
| 
| 8.18 (66)
| Junction Oval
| 9,000
| 30 August 1952
|- bgcolor="#FFFFFF"
| 
| 15.11 (101)
| 
| 11.10 (76)
| Punt Road Oval
| 28,000
| 30 August 1952
|- bgcolor="#FFFFFF"
| 
| 10.17 (77)
| 
| 3.14 (32)
| Kardinia Park
| 49,107
| 30 August 1952

Ladder

Finals

First Semi-Final

Second Semi-Final

Preliminary Final

Grand final

Awards
 The 1952 VFL Premiership team was Geelong.
 The VFL's leading goalkicker was John Coleman of Essendon with 103 goals.
 The winner of the 1952 Brownlow Medal was Roy Wright of Richmond with 21 votes. He won on a count-back from Bill Hutchison of Essendon.
As a consequence of its 1981 decision to change its rules relating to tied Brownlow Medal contests, the AFL awarded a retrospective medal to Bill Hutchison in 1989.
 St Kilda took the "wooden spoon" in 1952.

Notable events
 Essendon winger Lance Mann won the 1952, 130-yard Stawell Gift in eleven and fourteen-sixteenths seconds, off a handicap of 7¼yards; his teammate, half-back flanker Norm McDonald, running off a handicap of 5 yards, came second.
 Bowing to pressure from its players and supporters, Fitzroy abandoned "The Gorillas" as its emblem. Originally intended to signify strength, tenacity, aggression, power, etc. the symbol had become somewhat devalued when opposition supporters started referring to the team as "The Apes". "The Lions" was not introduced until 1957; in the interim they were known as either "The Maroons" or "The Roys".
 In May 1952, as part of its promotion of the Burt Lancaster movie Ten Tall Men, the management of the Melbourne cinema The State Theatre on the corner of Flinders Street and Russell Street (now known as the Forum Theatre) measured the height of the ten tallest VFL players. Geoff Leek of Essendon was officially declared to be the tallest, at 6'4½" (194.3 cm).
 As part of an effort by the Australian National Football Council to promote the game, a special round of VFL premiership matches was held in different cities around Australia on Queen's Birthday weekend: Brisbane, Sydney, Euroa, Yallourn, Albury and Hobart. Wet weather across much of eastern Australia affected crowds at Yallourn and Sydney, and forced the postponement of the match at Brisbane from Saturday afternoon to Monday evening after the RNA feared the match would damage the rain-sodden turf; but matches not affected by rain drew huge crowds, including:
The National Day Round was played in addition to the standard eighteen games, so that the people of Melbourne and Geelong would still have nine home matches. An interstate match between Victoria and Western Australia was played in Melbourne during that weekend. The endeavour was financed by the ANFC, which turned a small profit on the event after having insured the gate against rain.
In the First Semi-Final, Carlton's high marking centreman Keith Warburton received a heavy knock to his abdomen early in the match, but thought little of it. Later that evening he collapsed at the Carlton Club dance. He was rushed to hospital where it was discovered that he was suffering from a severed artery leading to his bowel. He hovered near death for some days, requiring almost continuous transfusions of blood. It was said that his physical fitness was the only reason he survived that time.
 In Round 10, in a match played in atrocious conditions at the Brunswick Street Oval, Fitzroy's champion full-back, Vic Chanter, held Essendon champion full-forward John Coleman goalless for the only time in his 98-game career.
 Overall, the season was the wettest season for more than 20 years. Many matches were played in deep sticky mud on grounds that were covered in sheets of water. Mud was ankle deep at the Brunswick Street Oval in Round 11. White balls were introduced in July to help players see the ball in all of the mud.
The overall bad weather and the atrocious condition of the grounds throughout the season, and the effect that had on the condition of the ball, especially in relation to hand-passing, marking and kicking, as well as the physical problems of leading and being unable to spring from muddy ground, highlights the significance of John Coleman's 103 goals in 18 matches.

Footnotes

References
 Maplestone, M., Flying Higher: History of the Essendon Football Club 1872–1996, Essendon Football Club, (Melbourne), 1996. 
 Rogers, S. & Brown, A., Every Game Ever Played: VFL/AFL Results 1897–1997 (Sixth Edition), Viking Books, (Ringwood), 1998. 
 Ross, J. (ed), 100 Years of Australian Football 1897–1996: The Complete Story of the AFL, All the Big Stories, All the Great Pictures, All the Champions, Every AFL Season Reported, Viking, (Ringwood), 1996.

External links
 1952 Season - AFL Tables

Australian Football League seasons
Vfl season